William Whitworth may refer to:
 Sir William Whitworth (Royal Navy officer) (1884–1973)
 William Whitworth (journalist) (born 1937), American journalist and editor
 William Whitworth (politician) (1813–1886), British cotton manufacturer and politician
 William Allen Whitworth (1840–1905), English mathematician and Church of England priest
 William Whitworth (archdeacon) (died 1804), Anglican priest